Jihan Abass (born 1993/1994) is a Kenyan entrepreneur and businesswoman who is the founder and CEO of Lami Insurance Technology, an insurance technology company based in Nairobi, Kenya, and Griffin Insurance, a digital vehicle insurance company. Abass founded Lami to increase Africa's low insurance coverage.

Abass was formerly a commodity futures trader and sugar trader at a trading house in London, England, where she traded on the New York City and London sugar markets.

Abass has an MBA from the University of Oxford and an undergraduate degree in finance from Bayes Business School.

Honors and awards 
In 2020, Abass was picked to represent Africa at InsureTech Connect 2020.

In 2021, Quartz named her an Africa Innovator.

References 

21st-century Kenyan businesswomen
21st-century Kenyan businesspeople
Businesspeople in insurance
Kenyan company founders
Alumni of the University of Oxford
Year of birth missing (living people)
Living people
Alumni of City, University of London
Kenyan expatriates in the United Kingdom